Sebastiscus tertius is a species of marine ray-finned fish belonging to the subfamily Sebastinae, the rockfishes, part of the family Scorpaenidae. It is found in the Western Pacific.

References

External links
 
 

tertius
Fish described in 1978